Parita District is a district (distrito) of Herrera Province in Panama. The population according to the 2000 census was 8,827. The district covers a total area of 364 km². The capital lies at the city of Parita.

Administrative divisions
Parita District is divided administratively into the following corregimientos:

Parita (capital)
Cabuya
Los Castillos
Llano de la Cruz
París
Portobelillo
Potuga

References

Districts of Panama
Herrera Province